In addition to the televised episodes of Doctor Who starring William Hartnell, the First Doctor has appeared in a number of spin-off media.

Audio dramas
TV Century 21 records created a 1966 album, featuring the cast, and retelling of the final serial The Chase (Doctor Who) simple called: The Daleks (1966)
Frostfire (an adventure related by the character Vicki) (2007)
Mother Russia (an adventure related by the character Steven) (2007)
Here There Be Monsters (an adventure related by the character Susan) (2008)
Home Truths (an adventure related by the character Sara Kingdom) (2008)
The Transit of Venus (an adventure related by the character Ian) (2009)
The Drowned World (an adventure related by the character Sara Kingdom) (2009)
The Suffering (an adventure related by the characters Steven & Vicki) (2010)
The Guardian of the Solar System (an adventure related by the character Sara Kingdom) (2010)
Farewell Great Macedon & Fragile Yellow Arc of Fragrance (adventures related by the characters Susan & Ian) (2010)
Quinnis (an adventure related by the character Susan) (2010)
The Perpetual Bond (an adventure related by the characters Steven & Oliver) (2011)
The Cold Equations (an adventure related by the characters Steven & Oliver) (2011)
Tales from the Vault (a short adventure related by the character Steven) (2011)
The Rocket Men (an adventure related by the character Ian) (2011)
The First Wave (an adventure related by the characters Steven & Oliver) (2011)
The Anachronauts (an adventure related by the characters Steven & Sara) (2012)
The Wanderer (an adventure related by the character Ian) (2012)
The Revenants (an adventure related by the character Ian) (2012)
The Time Museum (an adventure related by the character Ian) (2012)
The Masters of Luxor (adventure related by the characters Susan & Ian) (2012)
Return of the Rocket Men (an adventure related by the character Steven) (2012)
Destiny of the Doctor: Hunters of Earth (an adventure related by the character Susan) (2013)
The Flames of Cadiz (an adventure related by the character Ian) (2013)
The Library of Alexandria (an adventure related by the characters Susan & Ian) (2013)
The Alchemists (an adventure related by the character Susan) (2013)
The Dark Planet (an adventure related by the characters Ian and Vicki) (2013)
Upstairs (an adventure related by the characters Steven and Vicki) (2013)
The Light at the End (portrayed by William Russell) (2013)
The Beginning (an adventure related by the character Susan) (2013)
The Sleeping City (an adventure related by the character Ian) (2014)
Starborn (an adventure related by the character Vicki) (2014)
The War to End All Wars (an adventure related by the character Steven) (2014)
Domain of the Voord (an adventure related by the characters Susan and Ian) (2014)
The Doctor's Tale (an adventure related by the characters Ian and Vicki) (2014)
The Bounty of Ceres (an adventure related by the characters Vicki and Steven) (2014)
An Ordinary Life (an adventure related by the characters Steven and Sara Kingdom) (2014)
The First Doctor Volume 1 (Adventures related by the characters Susan, Vicki & Steven) (2015)
The Sleeping Blood
The Unwinding World
The Founding Fathers
The Locked Room
The Age of Endurance (an adventure related by the characters Susan, Ian and Barbara) (2016)
The Fifth Traveller (an adventure related by the characters Ian, Barbara, Vicki and Jospa) (2016)
The Ravelli Conspiracy (an adventure related by the characters Vicki and Steven) (2016)
The Sontarans (an adventure related by the characters Steven and Sara Kingdom) (2016)
The First Doctor Volume 2 (Adventures related by the character Vicki, Steven, and Polly) (2017)
Fields of Terror
Across the Darkened City
The Bonfires of the Vanities
The Plague of Dreams

Short Trips audios
Rise and Fall
1963
Seven to One
A Star is Born
The Flywheel Revolution
Etheria
The Sporting Part
The Falling
O Tannenbaum

Unbound alternative First Doctors
Geoffrey Bayldon
Auld Mortality
A Storm of Angels
Derek Jacobi
Deadline

Novels and short stories

Virgin New Adventures
All-Consuming Fire by Andy Lane (cameo appearance)

Virgin Missing Adventures
Venusian Lullaby by Paul Leonard
The Sorcerer's Apprentice by Christopher Bulis
The Empire of Glass by Andy Lane
The Man in the Velvet Mask by Daniel O'Mahony
The Plotters by Gareth Roberts

Past Doctor Adventures
The Witch Hunters by Steve Lyons
Salvation by Steve Lyons
City at World's End by Christopher Bulis
Bunker Soldiers by Martin Day
Byzantium! by Keith Topping
Ten Little Aliens by Stephen Cole
The Eleventh Tiger by David A. McIntee
The Time Travellers by Simon Guerrier

Eighth Doctor Adventures
The Eight Doctors by Terrance Dicks
 Seen in the TARDIS mirror in Camera Obscura

BBC Short Trips

Short Trips
The Last Days
There are Fairies at the Bottom of the Garden

More Short Trips
64 Carlysle Street
Romans Cutaway

Short Trips and Sidesteps
The Longest Story in the World
Nothing at the End of the Lane (3 Parts)
Planet of the Bunnoids

Big Finish Short Trips

Short Trips: Zodiac
The True and Indisputable Facts in the Case of the Ram’s Skull
Five Card Draw

Short Trips: Companions
The Little Drummer Boy
A Long Night

Short Trips: A Universe of Terrors
The Exiles
Mire and Clay by Gareth Wigmore
Ash

Short Trips: Steel Skies
Corridors of Power

Short Trips: Past Tense
The Thief of Sherwood
Bide-a-Wee

Short Trips: Life Science
Scribbles in Chalk  by Gareth Wigmore

Short Trips: Repercussions
The Rag and Bone Man's Story
The Schoolboy's Story
The Juror's Story

Short Trips: Monsters
From Eternity
Categorical Imperative

Short Trips: A Christmas Treasury
Every Day

Short Trips: Seven Deadly Sins
The Duke’s Folly by Gareth Wigmore

Short Trips: A Day in the Life
Waiting for Jeremy
Making History

Short Trips: The Solar System
Mars

Short Trips: The History of Christmas
Set in Stone
The Gift

Short Trips: Farewells
The Mother Road by Gareth Wigmore
The Three Paths

Short Trips: The Centenarian
Childhood Living

Short Trips: Time Signature
The Ruins of Time

Short Trips: Destination Prague
Room for Improvement
Life From Lifelessness
The Long Step Backward

Short Trips: Snapshots
Indian Summer

Short Trips: 2040
 /Carpenter/Butterfly/Baronet by Gareth Wigmore

Short Trips: Christmas Around the World
 Mirth, or Walking Spirits by Gareth Wigmore

Short Trips: Indefinable Magic
 The Reign Makers by Gareth Wigmore

Telos Doctor Who novellas
 Time and Relative by Kim Newman
 Frayed by Tara Samms

Penguin Fiftieth Anniversary eBook novellas
 A Big Hand for the Doctor by Eoin Colfer

Miscellaneous novellas
 Doctor Who and the Invasion from Space
In Chris Roberson's short story "Annus Mirabilis" from the second volume of Tales of the Shadowmen, it is strongly indicated that the French science fiction character Doctor Omega is the First Doctor, with him assuming the name Omega as a reference to Omega the Time Lord.

Comics

TV Comic
The Klepton Parasites		 	
The Therovian Quest			 	
The Hijackers of Thrax		 	
On the Web Planet			 	
The Gyros Injustice			 	
Challenge of the Piper			
Moon Landing				 	
Time in Reverse				
Lizardworld				 	
The Ordeals of Demeter			
Enter: The Go-Ray			 	
Shark Bait				 	
A Christmas Story			 	
The Didus Expedition			 	
Space Station Z-7			 	
Plague of the Black Scorpi	 		
The Trodos Tyranny			 	
The Secret of Gemino		 		
The Haunted Planet			 	
The Hunters of Zerox			 	
The Underwater Robot			 	
Return of the Trods			 	
The Galaxy Games			 	
The Experimenters

TV Comic Specials
Prisoners of Gritog			 	
Guests of King Neptune	 		
The Gaze of the Gorgon

Doctor Who Magazine
Food For Thought			 	
Operation Proteus

Doctor Who Magazine Specials
A Religious Experience		 	
Are You Listening?

IDW series
The Forgotten
 Prisoners of Time

Other Adventures
 The Masters of Luxor by Anthony Coburn
 Campaign by Jim Mortimore
 Destiny of the Doctors

Non-televised First Doctor stories